Endurance International Group (EIG), previously named BizLand, was an IT services company specializing in web hosting. The company was founded in 1997 and headquartered in Burlington, Massachusetts, USA. In 2021 Endurance International Group merged with Web.com forming a new company, Newfold Digital. It is one of the Internet's largest webhosting providers, the company was structured differently from other large hosting companies such as Rackspace, GoDaddy, or 1&1 Ionos.  The company has grown its hosting and related business through numerous acquisitions.

History 

In 2011, Endurance was bought from Accel-KKR by Warburg Pincus and GS Capital Partners, for around $975 million.  In September 2013, the company announced plans to raise $400 million in an IPO.  The company announced it would list on the NASDAQ under the ticker symbol EIGI.  It went public in October 2013 raising $252 million selling shares to the public at $12 each. This was below the company's target goal of $400 million.

This path to increased size is similar to the path networking company Verio followed in the 1990s, using free cash flow and access to capital markets in acquiring assets to add to their corporate portfolio. The concept was to roll up small ISPs into one large ISP and achieve economies of scale. Endurance acquired hosting companies domestically and internationally.

In March 2015, the company announced an investment in Netherlands-based technology startup AppMachine, acquiring 40% of the company. In August 2015, EIG announced the acquisition of Site5 and Verio Web Hosting from NTT. It is estimated that EIG gained 86,000+ new subscribers through these acquisitions. In November 2015, the company acquired Constant Contact, and days later laid off 15% of their workforce. Also in November 2015, EIG acquired the assets of Ecommerce, LLC for $28 million. 

In August 2018, the firm's CEO and CFO were fined US$8 million for fraud by the Securities and Exchange Commission (SEC) for misrepresenting company subscriber numbers.

Endurance acquired Ecomdash in October 2019 for $9.6 million in cash, and placed it under the Constant Contact group.

In November 2020, Clearlake Capital Group announced that it would acquire Endurance International Group for around $3 billion. At the closing of the deal in February 2021, Clearlake Capital announced a few wrinkles. Clearlake spun off the Endurance Web Presence division, including subsidiaries Domain.com, Bluehost, and HostGator.

Endurance Web Presence merged with Web.com to form a new company, Newfold Digital, in 2021. Newfold Digital is a joint venture between Clearlake Capital and Siris Capital Group, owner of Web.com since 2018. 

Clearlake also spun off the Constant Contact division of Endurance into a separate joint venture between Clearlake and Siris.

Subsidiary brands 
The company has owned and operated numerous hosting businesses, with shared support information and support agents. A partial list of subsidiaries and brands include:

 2slick.com
 AccountSupport
 Anchor
 Arvixe LLC
 A Small Orange
 ApolloHosting
 AppMachine
 Berry Information Systems L.L.C.
 BigRock
 BizLand
 BlueBoxInternet
 BlueDomino
 Bluehost
 BuyDomains
 CirtexHosting
 Crucial Web Hosting
 Constant Contact
 Digital Pacific
 Directi
 Domain.com
 DomainHost
 DonWeb.com
 Dot5Hosting
 Dotster
 Dreamscape Networks
 easyCGI
 Ecomdash
 eHost
 EmailBrain
 EntryHost
 Escalate Internet
 FastDomain
 FatCow
 FreeYellow
 Garin IT Solutions Co.
 Garin Technologies
 Glob@t
 Homestead
 HostCentric
 HostClear (defunct)
 HostGator
 HostNine
 HostMonster
 Hostopia Australia
 HostV VPS
 HostGallo
 hostwithmenow.com
 HostYourSite.com
 HyperMart
 IMOutdoors
 Intuit Websites
 iPage
 IPOWER/iPowerWeb
 IX Web Hosting
 JustHost
 LogicBoxes
 MojoMarketplace
 MyDomain
 MyResellerHome
 MySocialSuite
 NameJet
 NetFirms
 Network Solutions
 Networks Web Hosting
 Nexx
 Panthur
 PowWeb
 PublicDomainRegistry.com (PDR Ltd.)
 PureHost
 ReadyHosting.com
 Register.com
 ResellerClub
 Saba-Pro
 Scoot.com
 SEO Gears
 SEO Hosting
 SEO Web Hosting
 Site5
 Sitelio
 SnapNames
 Solid Cactus
 Southeast Web
 SpeedHost
 Spertly
 Spry
 StartLogic
 SuperGreen Hosting
 Typepad
 Unified Layer
 USANetHosting
 vDeck
 Apex Infosys India
 Verio
 VirtualAvenue
 VPSLink
 Web24
 Web.com
 WebHost4Life
 webhosting.info
 Webstrike Solutions
 Webzai Ltd.
 Xeran
 YourWebHosting
 Yoast.com

References

External links 
 for Newfold Technologies

 
Companies based in Burlington, Massachusetts
Companies based in Jacksonville, Florida
American companies established in 1997
Web hosting
Companies formerly listed on the Nasdaq
1997 establishments in Massachusetts
Technology companies established in 1997
Technology companies based in Massachusetts
Warburg Pincus companies
2013 initial public offerings
2021 mergers and acquisitions
Private equity portfolio companies